Barco NV is a Belgian technology company that specializes in digital projection and imaging technology, focusing on three core markets: entertainment, enterprise, and healthcare. It employs  employees located in 90 countries. The company has 400 granted patents. Barco is headquartered in Kortrijk, Belgium, and has its own facilities  for Sales & Marketing, Customer Support, R&D and Manufacturing in Europe, North America and Asia-Pacific. Shares of Barco are listed on Euronext Brussels. It has a market cap of around €1.2 billion (February 2018). Barco sells its ClickShare products to enable wireless projection from sender devices to receiver displays.

History 
Barco is an acronym that originally stood for Belgian American Radio Corporation. Barco was founded in 1934 in the town of Poperinge, in the Flemish-speaking region of Belgium. Founder Lucien de Puydt's initial business was to assemble radios from parts imported from the United States – hence the name of his company, the Belgium American Radio Corporation, or "Barco".

Radio pioneer Camiel Descamps gave the company a new start in 1941 in Kortrijk after founder Lucien Depuydt died. His wife Maria-Anna Reyntjens and his brother-in-law Joseph Versavel assisted him. Later on, also Elie Timmerman joined them. Starting from their office in Kortrijk, the company started to grow and spread around 90 countries across the globe.

In 1949, Barco started developing a multi-standard television that accepted different signal standards, becoming a leader in that field. A jukebox called Barc-O-Matic was sold from 1951. In 1967, it was one of the first European companies to introduce color TV. Building on this, it then entered the professional broadcast market in the late 1960s, supplying TV monitors to broadcasters.

From the 1960s onwards, Barco branched out into numerous other activities, which included mechanical components for industrial use, and quality control monitoring for the textile and plastics industries. In 1967, Barco became the first European manufacturer to produce transistor-based portable televisions.

Barco first entered projection technology in 1979 when it pioneered the development of cathode ray tube (CRT) projection aboard airplanes. Over the following years, it gradually focused solely on professional markets.

In the mid-1980s, Barco became a main projection technology supplier for computer giants IBM, Apple and Hewlett-Packard. In the late 1980s, it entered the Brussels stock market. By 1991, Barco's market share in the graphics projection market alone reached 75%, and the company had established offices across the world, including regional headquarters in the United States and East-Asia.

Through the 1990s and the first decade of the new millennium, Barco developed and marketed new display technologies such as liquid crystal display (LCD), light-emitting diodes (LED), Texas Instruments' Digital Light Processing (DLP), and later, liquid crystal on silicon (LCoS). It now covers markets that include media and entertainment, security and monitoring, medical imaging, avionics, 3D and virtual reality, digital cinema, traffic control, broadcast and training and simulation.

In 2018, Barco entered into a joint venture with China Film Group Corporation (CFG), Appotronics and CITICPE to commercialize each company's products and services for the global cinema market excluding mainland China: Cinionic. In Barco's case, this involved the company's cinema projectors.

Sustainability 
Barco's Corporate Sustainability Committee, consisting of 13 members, under the leadership of Filip Pintelon, devises an overall sustainability strategy. Under the label "Barco 2020", Barco is currently developing a sustainability plan encompassing three pillars: their people, their community and the planet.

A few achievements:
 Supplier Sustainability program
 Health and Safety Arrangements
 Compliance

Acquisitions 

 In 1989, Barco acquired EMT, a manufacturer of phonograph turntables and professional audio equipment, which became Barco-EMT.
 Barco Graphics was the graphics division of the Belgian Barco Group. It was the result of the 1989 merger of Digitized Information Systems Corporation (D.I.S.C.), Aesthedes and Barco's own "Creative Systems" group.
 In 1995, Barco acquired Elbicon, a manufacturer of inspection systems for the food processing industry.
 In 1997, Barco acquired Electronic Image Systems (EIS), a manufacturer of CRT projectors for the flight simulation market.
 In 1998, Barco acquired Dr. Seufert, a manufacturer of visual sub-systems for integration in process control rooms.
 In 1998, Barco ETS, now Ucamco acquired Gerber Systems Corp., a manufacturer of plotters and automatic optical inspection (AOI) systems for printed circuit boards.
 In 1999, it acquired Metheus Corporation, a Tektronix spin-off and manufacturer of professional graphics controllers.
 In 2000, it acquired Texen, a subsidiary of Thales (ex-Thomson).
 In 2004, it acquired Voxar, a 3D medical imaging software company.
 In 2004, it acquired Folsom Research, Inc., whose product lines cover image processing, image communication and image functionality & interactivity.
 In 2008, it acquired High End Systems, an automated luminaires, digital lighting and lighting controls company.
 In 2010, it acquired Fimi S.r.l., a company specialized in medical image displays, from Philips (no relationship with Fimi, Federazione Industria Musicale Italiana).
 In 2010, it acquired all intellectual property of Element Labs, a manufacturer of LED equipment.
 In 2010, it acquired dZine, a Belgium-based company specialized in Digital signage.
 In 2012, it acquired IP Video Systems, a company specialized in networked visualization.
 In 2012, it acquired JAOtech, a manufacturer of patient entertainment and point-of-care terminals for hospitals.
 In 2013, it acquired AWIND, a manufacturer of hardware and software for wireless presentation systems.
 In 2013, it acquired projectiondesign, a manufacturer of projection technology.
 In 2014, it acquired X20 Media Inc., an enterprise communication specialist.
 In 2014, it acquired IOSONO GmbH, a 3D audio expert.
 In 2015, it acquired Advan Int'l Corp., a manufacturer of LCD displays.
 In 2016, it acquired Medialon Inc., a US based company.
 In 2016, it acquired MTT Innovation Inc., a Canadian developer of next-generation projection technology (HDR).
 In 2019, it acquired a 5% stake in Unilumin group, a china based LED manufacturer.

Divestments

 In 2000, Barco splits its shares in Barco New and BarcoNet  which is taken over by Scientific-Atlanta in 2001 and becomes whole owner of a after buy-out of the remaining shareholders in 2002.
 In 2001, Barco Graphics was acquired by Danish Purup-Eskofot, and renamed Esko-Graphics, which was again renamed Esko in 2006.
 In 2003, Barco sold Barco-EMT including trademarks to Walter Derrer. The company is continued as EMT Studiotechnik GmbH.
 In 2004, Barco sold its Dotrix activity to Agfa–Gevaert.
 In 2007, BarcoVision was acquired by Itema Group from Bergamo, Italy.
 In 2008, Barco sold its Advanced Visualisation (AVIS) group (the previously acquired Voxar) to Toshiba Medical (TMSC).
 In 2014, Barco divested a wholly owned subsidiary of Barco NV, Barco Orthogon, based in Bremen, Germany, to Exelis.
 In 2015, Barco's Defense & Aerospace division was sold to US-based Esterline Technologies Corporation.
 In 2017, Barco sold High End Systems to Electronic Theatre Controls.
 In 2018, Barco's X20 Media was sold to Stratacache.
 In 2018, Barco divested the wholly owned subsidiary Barco Silex, which becomes Silex Inside.

Management 
 CEO 2021 Charles Beauduin & An Steegen 
 CEO 2016-2021 Jan De Witte
 CEO 2008–2016 Eric Van Zele
 CEO 2002–2008 Martin De Prycker
 CEO 2002 Hugo Vandamme

Active markets 
 Entertainment: cinema, venues and hospitality
 Enterprise: control rooms, education and meeting rooms
 Healthcare: diagnostic, surgical and clinical imaging

See also
 Barco Creator
 Barco Escape

References

External links 
 

Belgian companies established in 1934
Manufacturing companies established in 1934
Technology companies established in 1934
Information technology companies of Belgium
Display technology companies
Film and video technology
Medical imaging
Companies listed on Euronext Brussels
Companies based in West Flanders
Radio manufacturers